The Union of Baptist Churches in Rwanda is a Baptist Christian denomination in Rwanda. It is affiliated with the Baptist World Alliance. The headquarters is in Kigali.

History
The Union of Baptist Churches in Rwanda has its origins in a Baptist mission of Baptist Union of Denmark in 1939. The union is founded in 1962. According to a denomination census released in 2020, it claimed 120 churches and 257,613 members.

See also 
 Bible
 Born again
 Worship service (evangelicalism)
 Jesus Christ
 Believers' Church

References

External links
 Official Website

Baptist denominations in Africa
Evangelicalism in Rwanda